Pablo Guido Larrea Gambara (born 4 February 1994) is a Spanish footballer who plays as a central midfielder for CD Tenerife.

Club career
Born in Madrid, Larrea represented Villarreal CF as a youth, and made his senior debut with the C-team during the 2011–12 season, in Tercera División. On 27 June 2015, he signed a new two-year contract with the club, being promoted to the reserves in Segunda División B.

On 5 July 2017, Larrea signed a two-year contract with Segunda División club CD Numancia. He made his professional debut on 26 August, coming on as a late substitute for Iñigo Pérez in a 2–2 away draw against Rayo Vallecano.

On 25 January 2019, after being rarely used during the first half of the campaign, Larrea was loaned to SD Ponferradina in the third division, until June. On 15 July, after achieving promotion to the second level, he joined Ponfe permanently.

Larrea scored his first professional goal on 7 September 2019, netting the opener in a 1–1 away draw against CF Fuenlabrada. On 25 August 2021, he moved to fellow second division side CD Tenerife on a one-year deal.

References

External links

1994 births
Living people
Footballers from Madrid
Spanish footballers
Association football midfielders
Segunda División players
Segunda División B players
Tercera División players
Villarreal CF C players
Villarreal CF B players
CD Numancia players
SD Ponferradina players
CD Tenerife players